Ian Kelly may refer to:

Ian Kelly (actor) (born 1966), British actor and historical biographer
Ian Kelly (cricketer) (born 1959), Australian cricketer
Ian C. Kelly (born 1953), U.S. diplomat and ambassador
Ian Kelly (songwriter) (born 1979), Canadian singer-songwriter